Hikayat Inderaputera (حكاية ايندراڤوترا) is a Malay literary work, a hikayat relating the adventures of Prince Inderaputera, son of the king of Semantapura.

References

Further reading
 Chambert-Loir Henri. "S.W.R. Mulyadi, Hikayat Indraputra. A Malay romance". [compte-rende] In: Archipel, volume 33, 1987. pp. 206–207. www.persee.fr/doc/arch_0044-8613_1987_num_33_1_2355
 Mulyadi, Rujiati. "Rona Keislaman dalam Hikayat Indraputra". In: Archipel, volume 20, 1980. De la philologie à l'histoire. pp. 133–142. DOI: https://doi.org/10.3406/arch.1980.1594; www.persee.fr/doc/arch_0044-8613_1980_num_20_1_1594
 Winstedt, R. O. "Hikayat Indraputra". In: Journal of the Straits Branch of the Royal Asiatic Society, no. 85 (1922): 46-53. Accessed September 12, 2020. http://www.jstor.org/stable/41561393.

Malay-language literature
16th-century books